The 1982 Miami Redskins football team was an American football team that represented Miami University in the Mid-American Conference (MAC) during the 1982 NCAA Division I-A football season. In its fifth and final season under head coach Tom Reed, the team compiled a 6–4 record (5–3 against MAC opponents), finished in third place in the MAC, and outscored all opponents by a combined total of 195 to 121.

The team's statistical leaders included John Appold with 1,051 passing yards, Jay Peterson with 1,157 rushing yards, and Keith Dummitt with 333 receiving yards.

Schedule

References

Miami
Miami RedHawks football seasons
Miami Redskins football